Guru Ram Das (Gurmukhi: ਗੁਰੂ ਰਾਮ ਦਾਸ,; 24 September 1534 – 1 September 1581) was the fourth of the ten Sikh gurus. He was born in a family based in Lahore. His birth name was Jetha, and he was orphaned at age seven; he there after grew up with his maternal grandmother in a village.

At age 12, Bhai Jetha and his grandmother moved to Goindval, where they met Guru Amar Das. The boy thereafter accepted Guru Amar Das as his mentor and served him. The daughter of Guru Amar Das married Bhai Jetha, and he thus became part of Guru Amar Das's family. As with the first two Gurus of Sikhism, Guru Amar Das instead of choosing his own sons, chose Bhai Jetha, owing to Bhai Jetha's exemplary service, selfless devotion and unquestioning obedience to the commands of the Guru, as his successor and renamed him as Ram Das or "servant of god."

Guru Ram Das became the Guru of Sikhism in 1574 and served as the 4th guru until he gave up his body to transcend the material world in 1581. He faced hostility from the sons of Guru Amar Das, and shifted his official base to lands identified by Guru Amar Das as Guru-ka-Chak. This newly founded town was eponymous Ramdaspur, later to evolve and be renamed as Amritsar – the holiest city of Sikhism. He is also remembered in the Sikh tradition for expanding the manji organization for clerical appointments and donation collections to theologically and economically support the Sikh movement. He appointed his own son as his successor, and unlike the first four Gurus who were not related through descent, the fifth through tenth Sikh Gurus were the direct descendants of Guru Ram Das.

Early life 

Bhai Jetha was born on 24 September 1534 in a family belonging to the Sodhi gotra (clan) of the Khatri caste in Chuna Mandi, Lahore. His father Sri Hari Das and mother Mata Daya both died when he was aged seven. his grandmother took him to her village, Besarke, Ram Das lived there for five years,.
Guru Amar Das was then living at Khadur at the sangat of Guru Angad. Ram Das went to Khadur in 1546, attended Guru Angad's sangats, and developed great liking for the Guru and Amar Das. When Guru Amar Das settled at Goindwal in 1552, Ram Das also moved to the new township, and spent Most of his time at the guru's darbar, In 1553, he married Bibi Bhani, the younger daughter of Amar Das. They had three sons: Prithi Chand, Mahadev and Guru Arjan.

Before becoming Guru, Ram Das represented Guru Amar Das in the Mughal court.

Guruship

Ram Das become guru in 1574, at the age of 40, and held the office for 7 years. Guru Ram Das is credited with building the city of Amritsar.  

Guru Ram Das is credited with founding the holy city of Amritsar in the Sikh tradition. Two versions of stories exist regarding the land where Guru Ram Das settled. In one based on a Gazetteer record, the land was purchased with Sikh donations, for 700 rupees from the owners of the village of Tung.

According to the Sikh historical records, the site was chosen by Guru Amar Das and called Guru Da Chakk, after he had asked Guru Ram Das to find land to start a new town with a man made pool as its central point. After his coronation in 1574, and the hostile opposition he faced from the sons of Sri Guru Amar Das, Guru Ram Das founded the town named after him as "Ramdaspur". He started by completing the pool, and building his new official Guru centre and home next to it. He invited merchants and artisans from other parts of India to settle into the new town with him. The town expanded during the time of Guru Arjan financed by donations and constructed by voluntary work. The town grew to become the city of Amritsar, and the pool area grew into a temple complex after his son built the gurdwara Harmandir Sahib, and installed the scripture of Sikhism inside the new temple in 1604.

The construction activity between 1574 and 1604 is described in Mahima Prakash Vartak, a semi-historical Sikh hagiography text likely composed in 1741, and the earliest known document dealing with the lives of all the ten Gurus.

Scripture hymns
Guru Ram Das composed 638 hymns, or about ten percent of hymns in the Guru Granth Sahib. He was a celebrated poet, and composed his work in 30 ancient ragas of Indian classical music.

These cover a range of topics:

His compositions continue to be sung daily in Harimandir Sahib (Golden temple) of Sikhism.

Wedding hymn

Guru Ram Das, along with Guru Amar Das, are credited with various parts of the Anand and Laavan composition in Suhi mode. It is a part of the ritual of four clockwise circumambulation of the Sikh scripture by the bride and groom to solemnize the marriage in Sikh tradition. This was intermittently used, and its use lapsed in late 18th century. However, sometime in 19th or 20th century by conflicting accounts, the composition of Guru Ram Das came back in use along with Anand Karaj ceremony, replacing the Hindu ritual of circumambulation around the fire. The composition of Guru Ram emerged to be one of the bases of the British colonial era Anand Marriage Act of 1909.

The wedding hymn was composed by Guru Ram Das for his own daughter's wedding. The first stanza of the Laavan hymn by Guru Ram Das refers to the duties of the householder's life to accept the Guru's word as guide, remember the Divine Name. The second verse and circle reminds the singular One is encountered everywhere and in the depths of the self. The third speaks of the Divine Love. The fourth reminds that the union of the two is the union of the individual with the Infinite.

Masand system
While Guru Amar Das introduced the manji system of religious organization, Guru Ram Das extended it with adding the masand institution. The masand were Sikh community leaders who lived far from the Guru, but acted to lead the distant congregations, their mutual interactions and collect revenue for Sikh activities and Gurudwara building. This institutional organization famously helped grow Sikhism in the decades that followed, but became infamous in the era of later Gurus, for its corruption and its misuse in financing rival Sikh movements in times of succession disputes.

Death and Succession

Guru Ram Das died on 1 September 1581, in Goindwal, he nominated his younger son, Arjan Dev, as his successor. The Guru's eldest son Prithi Chand vehemently protested against his father suppression. The second son Mahadev did not press his claim. Prithi Chand used offensive language to his father, and then informed Baba Budhha that his father had acted inappropriately, the guruship was his own right. He vowed that he would remove Guru Arjan, and make himself the Guru. Later Prithi Chand created a rival faction which the Sikhs following Guru Arjan called Minas literally, "scoundrels"), and is alleged to have attempted to assassinate young Hargobind. However, alternate competing texts written by the Prithi Chand led Sikh faction to offer a different story, contradict this explanation on Hargobind's life, and present the elder son of Guru Ram Das as devoted to his younger brother Guru Arjan. The competing texts do acknowledge disagreement and describe Prithi Chand as having become the Sahib Guru after the martyrdom of Guru Arjan Dev and disputing the succession of Guru Hargobind, the grandson of Guru Ram Das.

Gallery

References

External links

Sikh-History.com

Sikh gurus
1534 births
1581 deaths
Punjabi people
Indian city founders